John P. Cohalan (March 17, 1873 Brooklyn, Kings County, New York – 1950) was an American lawyer and politician from New York.

Life
He was the son of Timothy E. Cohalan and Ellen (O'Leary) Cohalan. The family removed to Middletown in the Summer of 1873; and to the Bronx in September 1889. He graduated from Wallkill Academy in 1889, and from Manhattan College in 1893. Then he studied law, was admitted to the bar in 1895, and practiced in New York City. In 1898, he married Margaret Kiernan (1876–1964), and they had several children.

Cohalan was a member of the New York State Assembly (New York Co., 35th D.) in 1906; a member of the New York State Senate (22nd D.) in 1907 and 1908; and Surrogate of New York County from 1909 to 1922.

He died in 1950, and was buried at the Old St. Raymond's Cemetery in the Bronx.

New York Supreme Court Justice Daniel F. Cohalan (1867–1946) was his brother.

Sources
 Official New York from Cleveland to Hughes by Charles Elliott Fitch (Hurd Publishing Co., New York and Buffalo, 1911, Vol. IV; pg. 352 and 366)
 TAMMANY NAMES LEHMAN, COHALAN in NYT on October 8, 1908
 FEW FEET OF LAND COST CITY THOUSANDS in NYT on December 5, 1908
 DIX NAMES COHALAN FOR SUPREME COURT in NYT on May 19, 1911
 COHALAN TURNDOWN DENOUNCED BY BAR in NYT on October 12, 1922

External links
 

1873 births
1950 deaths
Democratic Party New York (state) state senators
People from Brooklyn
People from Middletown, Orange County, New York
Manhattan College alumni
New York (state) state court judges
Burials at Saint Raymond's Cemetery (Bronx)
Politicians from the Bronx